"Don't Think They Know" is a song by American singer Chris Brown featuring a posthumous appearance from fellow American singer Aaliyah.  It was released on June 17, 2013, as the second official single from Brown's sixth studio album X. The song, produced by Mel & Mus, contains an interpolation from the Tim & Bob produced single "They Don't Know" by Jon B. The song peaked at number 81 on the US Billboard Hot 100.

Background 
"Don't Think They Know" was originally a duet between Aaliyah and Playa member Digital Black, recorded in 2001 and produced by J-Dub. The song was later released in 2005 on Black's Memoirs of a R&B Thug album. The 2013 version, first introduced as "They Don't Know", with Chris Brown as the lead singer, features not only previously heard Aaliyah's part, but also vocals that were not used in Black's version.
"Don't Think They Know" was released to digital retailers on June 17, 2013 and was sent to Rhythmic contemporary radio in the United States on July 1, 2013.

Music video
The music video for the song was shot in Los Angeles, California and was released in correspondence to the single on June 17, 2013. Aaliyah appears as a hologram which are actually scenes from Aaliyah's 2000 video "Try Again" and 1996's "If Your Girl Only Knew".

Theme
The themes of the video are unity and peace, raising awareness of the widespread poverty and gun violence in African American neighbourhoods. Brown, when talking to MTV News about the video said: "When I did the video I wanted to do kind of like the Boyz n the Hood theme, also bringing an aspect of the side of the world that people never really talk about anymore. Gun violence or stuff that we deal with in our neighborhood or community that we could just stop".

Synopsis
The video is shot in a grey filter however some objects in the video such as Brown's hair is shot in red and blue which is supposed to represent the Bloods and Crips. The video begins with a quote by Brown: 

Its visuals start with the R&B singer sitting in a car alongside 3 other men driving in a neighborhood looking for trouble. Brown then asks them to stop the car as he gets out as he walks off out into another block. The music begins as Brown is singing in front of Aaliyah who is shown as a hologram from stock footage. In the plot scenes, Brown is seen leading a group of people while this group is seen walking around the neighborhood leading a peace walk during the entire video. Brown puts up a message saying rest in peace to late Compton rapper Michael "Lil Frogg" Reshard, Jr. who was shot and killed on March 27, 2013 in the end of the video. As the video fades to black a message appears saying:

Track listing
 Digital single

Charts

Certifications

Radio and release history

References

2013 singles
2013 songs
Chris Brown songs
Aaliyah songs
RCA Records singles
Songs written by Bob Robinson (songwriter)
Songs written by Tim Kelley
Contemporary R&B ballads
Songs written by Verse Simmonds